Transylvanian may refer to:

 anyone or anything related to Transylvania

Geography
 Transylvanian Plain
 Transylvanian Plateau
 Transylvanian Mountains

History
 Transylvanian Principality (1570-1711)
 Transylvanian Principality (1711-1867)
 Transylvanian Military Frontier
 Transylvanian peasant revolt
 Transylvanian voivode
 Transylvanian School
 Transylvanian Memorandum
 Transylvanian unification with Romania (Romanian National Assembly)
 Transylvanian flag and coat of arms

Linguistics
 Transylvanian varieties of Romanian
 Transylvanian Saxon dialect
 Transylvanian Romani

People
 Transylvanian Saxons
 Transylvanian Hungarians
 Transylvanian Landler

Religion
 Transylvanian Reformed Diocese
 Transylvanian Unitarian Church

Institutions
 Transylvanian Diet
 Transylvanian Museum
 Transylvanian Museum of Ethnography
 National Museum of Transylvanian History

Organizations
 Transylvanian Peasants' Party
 Group of Transylvanian Saxons
 Association of Transylvanian Saxons in Germany
 Transylvanian Society of Dracula

Arts
 Transylvanian music
 Transylvanian Regurgitations
 Transilvanian Hunger

Others
 Transylvanian mining railway
 Transylvanian rugs
 Transylvanian Hound

See also
 Transylvania (disambiguation)
 Transylvanian Carpathians (disambiguation)
 Transylvanianism